BMX may refer to:
 BMX, a sport of racing on bicycles on motocross style tracks 
 BMX bike, a bicycle used for casual use and sport, and designed mainly for dirt and motocross cycling
 Big Mountain Air Force Station (IATA: BMX), a military use airstrip located near Big Mountain, Alaska
 Cytoplasmic tyrosine-protein kinase BMX, an enzyme that in humans is encoded by the BMX gene
 BMX (quadraphonic sound), a quadrophonic sound system